Kuppadi  is a village near Sultan Bathery in Wayanad district in the state of Kerala, India.The famous  St Mary's College, Sulthan Bathery is situated in this village.

Population
Kuppadi Village Total population is 26662 and number of houses are 6328. Female Population is 50.6%. Village literacy rate is 80.7% and the Female Literacy rate is 39.8%.

Educational institutions
 St Mary's College, Sulthan Bathery
St. Mary's College, Sulthan Bathery is a Post Graduate Aided College managed by the Malankara Orthodox Syrian Church of the East is located in kuppadi. It was established in the year 1965. St. Mary's College is the first higher education College in Wayanad.
 St. Marys College Higher Secondary School
 Govt. High School Kuppadi
Established in 1934 as kidanganad LP school.
 Nirmala Matha Public School (CBSE)
It is also managed by malankara Orthodox Syrian Church of the east. Established in 1992.

Other
Another main attraction of the village is Town Square which is a park near St Marys college ground.
The St Marys college cricket ground is one of the ground recognised by Kerala Cricket Association.
The temple Durga bagavathy Kshethram is situated in the centre of the town.
The Village Office which is a smart village office is located near the mini civil station Sultan Bathery.

Transportation
There are two bus service running through named 'Govind' and 'vanampadi'. 
The nearest railway station is at Mysore and the nearest airports are Kozhikode International Airport-120 km, Bengaluru International Airport-290 km, and   Kannur International Airport, 58 km.

Politics
The Kuppadi is the 12th division under Sultan Bathery municipality. K. Rasheed of CPI(M) is the councillor

References

Villages in Wayanad district
Sultan Bathery area